CCTT may refer to:
 The Cable Company of Trinidad and Tobago
 The Canadian Council of Technicians and Technologists
 International Coordinating Council on Trans-Eurasian Transportation